Davood Ghadami (born 7 August 1982) is an English actor. Following his appearances in Taggart in 2010, he appeared in the BBC medical programmes Doctors and Casualty in recurring roles. In 2014, he began portraying the role of Kush Kazemi in the BBC soap opera EastEnders, a role he stayed in until 2021 when the character was killed off. Following Ghadami's departure from EastEnders, it was announced that he had joined the cast of the BBC medical drama Holby City as Eli Ebrahimi.

Early and personal life
Ghadami was born on 7 August 1982 in Harlow, Essex. He is of British and Iranian ancestry. He found it difficult at school, since being mixed race led to verbal bullying. He subsequently moved to Saint Nicholas School in Old Harlow. In 2010, Ghadami married long-term girlfriend Isobel; the pair have two daughters together.

Career
In 2010, Ghadami portrayed the role of Duncan Clark in the final series of the ITV detective drama Taggart. He found the role challenging, since it involved looking at photos of genuine crime scenes. Following this, he appeared in the BBC soap opera Doctors in the recurring role of Aran Chandar from 2012 to 2013. 

From 2013 to 2014, he appeared in the BBC medical drama Casualty as Ramin Tehrani. Other television credits include Life's Too Short, Law & Order, Skins Redux, Doctor Who, Top Boy, Fast Freddie, Silent Witness, Criminal Justice and Spooks. 

On stage, he has played Amir in 13 at The National, as well as working for York Theatre Royal and Pilot Theatre.

In 2014, Ghadami joined the cast of EastEnders as series regular Kush Kazemi, for which he won the award for Best Newcomer at the TV Choice Awards. He was also nominated for Best Newcomer and Best Actor at the British Soap Awards. 

In August 2017, Ghadami was announced as a contestant for the fifteenth series of Strictly Come Dancing. He was partnered with professional dancer Nadiya Bychkova. They were eliminated in week 11 of the competition, in the quarter-finals. 

In April 2021, it was announced that Ghadami had joined the cast of the BBC medical drama Holby City as Eli Ebrahimi.

Filmography

Awards and nominations

References

External links
 
 
 

1982 births
21st-century English male actors
English male film actors
English male soap opera actors
English male stage actors
English people of Iranian descent
Living people
Male actors from Essex
People from Harlow